The 2022 season was the 101st in the Cruzeiro Esporte Clube's existence.

Along with the Campeonato Brasileiro Série B, the club will also compete in the Campeonato Mineiro and in the Copa do Brasil.

Players

Squad information

Youth players with first team numbers

Competitions

Overview

Campeonato Mineiro

First stage

Knockout stage

Semi-finals

Final

Campeonato Brasileiro Série B

League table

Results by round

Matches

Copa do Brasil

First stage

Second stage

Third stage

Round of 16

References

External links 
 Cruzeiro official website (in Portuguese)

Brazilian football clubs 2022 season
2022 Cruzeiro Esporte Clube season